Electric Dreams is a 1984 science fiction romantic comedy film directed by Steve Barron (in his feature film directorial debut) and written by Rusty Lemorande. The film is set in San Francisco and depicts a love triangle  among a man, a woman, and a personal computer. It stars Lenny Von Dohlen, Virginia Madsen, Maxwell Caulfield, and the voice of Bud Cort.

The film received mixed reviews from critics. Its credits dedicate it to the memory of UNIVAC I.

Plot 
Miles Harding is an architect who envisions a brick shaped like a jigsaw puzzle piece that could enable buildings to withstand earthquakes. Seeking a way to get organized, he buys a personal computer to help him develop his ideas. Although he is initially unsure that he will even be able to correctly operate the computer, he later buys numerous extra gadgets that were not necessary for his work, such as switches to control household appliances like the blender, a speech synthesizer, and a microphone. The computer addresses Miles as "Moles", because Miles had incorrectly typed his name during the initial set-up. When Miles attempts to download the entire database from a mainframe computer at work, his computer begins to overheat. In a state of panic, Miles uses a nearby bottle of champagne to douse the overheating machine, which then becomes sentient. Miles initially is unaware of the computer's newfound sentience, but discovers it one night when he is awakened by the computer in the middle of the night when it mimics Miles talking in his sleep.

A love triangle soon develops among Miles, his computer (who later identifies himself as Edgar), and Miles's neighbor, an attractive cellist named Madeline Robistat. Upon hearing her practicing Minuet in G major, BWV Anh. 114 from Notebook for Anna Magdalena Bach on her cello through an air vent connecting both apartments, Edgar promptly elaborates a parallel variation of the piece, leading to an improvised duet. Believing it was Miles who had engaged her in the duet, Madeline begins to fall in love with him though she has an ongoing relationship with fellow musician Bill.

At Miles' request, Edgar composes a piece of music for Madeline. When their mutual love becomes evident, however, Edgar responds with jealousy, cancelling Miles' credit cards and registering him as an "armed and dangerous" criminal. Upon discovering this humiliation, Miles and Edgar have a confrontation, where Miles shoves the computer and tries to unplug it, getting an electric shock. Then, the computer retaliates by harassing him with an improvised maze of remotely controlled household electronics, in the style of Pac-Man.

Eventually, Edgar accepts Madeline and Miles' love for each other, and appears to commit suicide by sending a large electric current out through his acoustic coupler modem, around the world, and finally reaching back to himself just after he and Miles make amends.

Later, as Madeline and Miles go on vacation together, Edgar's voice is heard on the radio dedicating a song to "the ones I love", titled "Together in Electric Dreams". The credits are interspersed with scenes of the song being heard all over California, including a radio station trying to shut it off, declaring that they do not know where the signal is coming from.

Cast 
 Lenny Von Dohlen as Miles Harding
 Virginia Madsen as Madeline Robistat
 Maxwell Caulfield as Bill
 Bud Cort as Voice of Edgar
 Don Fellows as Mr. Ryley
 Miriam Margolyes as Ticket girl
 Giorgio Moroder as Record producer
 Koo Stark as Girl in Soap Opera

Production 
Steve Barron had made more than 100 music videos and routinely sent them to his mother for comment. She particularly liked one he did for Haysi Fantayzee; she was doing continuity on Yentl, co-produced by Rusty Lemorande and Larry deWaay and showed it to them. Lemorande had finished his own script for Electric Dreams and was looking for a director; he offered Barron the job.

Barron took the script to Virgin Films, and it agreed to finance within four days. The film was presold to Metro-Goldwyn-Mayer who held rights for the U.S., Canada, Japan and South East Asia. Two months after Virgin agreed to make the movie, filming began in San Francisco. Studio work was done in London at Twickenham Studios.

Virginia Madsen later recalled she "was very spoiled on that movie, because it was such a lovefest that I now believe that every movie should be like that ... I had a mad, crazy crush on Lenny Von Dohlen. God, we were so ... we were head-over-heels for each other. Nothing happened, and at this point, I admit it: I wanted it to happen ... He's still one of my best friends."

Bud Cort provided the voice of the computer. The director did not want Cort to be seen by the other actors during scenes so Cort had to do his lines in a padded box on a sound stage. He said, "It got a little lonely in there, I must admit. I kept waiting to meet the other actors, but nobody came to say hello." Boy George visited the set and, being a fan of Harold and Maude, got Cort's autograph.

The computer hardware company's name in the film is "Pinecone", a play on Apple Computer.

The movie features music from Giorgio Moroder, Culture Club, Jeff Lynne (Electric Light Orchestra), and Heaven 17. During filming, Barron said, "The fact that there's so much music has to do with the success of Flashdance. This film isn't Flashdance 2. Flashdance worked because of the dancing. It didn't have a story. Electric Dreams does."

Barron later said "Electric Dreams was definitely an attempt to try and weave the early 1980s music video genre into a movie. ... [The film] isn't that deep. The closest parallel is probably that it's a Cyrano de Bergerac-like exploration of how words and music can help nurture and grow feelings on the path to love. Oops that's too deep." In 2015, he said when he made the film there was a prejudice against video clip directors doing drama, and because Electric Dreams "was a little bit like an extended music video... I didn't help that cause in a lot of ways. (laughs)".

Fans of Electric Dreams have noted the similarities between the film and Spike Jonze's Her. When asked about it, Jonze claimed not to have seen the former film. In 2009 Barron said that Madsen told him she was planning on being involved in a remake. He said, "She didn't ask me to do it, so I guess I blew my chance on the first one! I wouldn't actually do it, but it would have been nice for the ego to be asked."

Music 

The soundtrack features music from prominent popular musicians of the time, being among the movies of this generation that actively explored the commercial link between a movie and its soundtrack. The soundtrack album Electric Dreams was re-issued on CD in 1998.

Steve Barron later recalled:

Release

Critical reception 
On Rotten Tomatoes the film has an approval rating of 44% based on 18 reviews.

The New York Times said that the film failed to "blend and balance its ingredients properly", and that it lost plot elements and taxed credibility.

The Los Angeles Times called it "inspired and appealing... a romantic comedy of genuine sweetness and originality".

Film critics Gene Siskel and Roger Ebert each gave the film 3.5 out of 4 stars, with Siskel writing that it showed a new director eager to show off his talents and Ebert writing "One of the nicest things about the movie is the way it maintains its note of slightly bewildered innocence."

Home media 
Electric Dreams was released in 1984 (VHS) and again in 1991 (VHS) in the US. MGM/UA Home Video released a Laserdisc in America in 1985, and Warner Bros. released a Video CD version for the Singapore market in 2001. The film received a Region 2 DVD on April 6, 2009 by MGM (which owns Orion Pictures and international rights to the Virgin/M.E.C.G film catalog they purchased in the mid 90s). UK video label Second Sight has released a Blu-ray on 7 August 2017, making its worldwide debut.

See also 
 Cyrano de Bergerac, a play written in 1897 by Edmond Rostand, featuring a brilliant but unattractive swordsman who woos the woman he loves on behalf of a handsome but tongue-tied friend.
 Her, a 2013 film about a man who develops a relationship with a computer operating system

References

External links 
 
 
 

1980s science fiction comedy films
1984 independent films
1984 films
1984 romantic comedy films
American science fiction comedy films
American independent films
American romantic comedy films
British independent films
British romantic comedy films
British science fiction comedy films
Films about artificial intelligence
Films about computing
Films about technological impact
Films directed by Steve Barron
Films scored by Giorgio Moroder
Films set in San Francisco
Metro-Goldwyn-Mayer films
1984 directorial debut films
1980s English-language films
1980s American films
1980s British films